The Greek Women's Cup (Greek: Κυπελλούχοι Ελλάδας) is the national women's football cup competition in Greece. It was played out for three seasons from 2000 to 2002.  It returned in the 2012–13 season.

List of finals
The following is a list of all three finals.

See also
Greek Cup, men's edition

References

External links
Cup at epo.gr

Gre
Football competitions in Greece